Kalaburagi division, formerly known as Gulbarga division, is one of the four divisions of the Indian state of Karnataka. It has seven districts, namely: Bellary district, Bidar district, Kalaburagi district, Koppal district, Raichur district, Yadgir district, and Vijayanagar district. It was the southwestern part of the former princely state of Hyderabad State. Kalaburagi is the headquarters of Kalaburagi division. The total area of the division is 44,138 sq.km. The total population as of 2011 census is 11,215,224.

See also
Districts of Karnataka

References

External links 
Regional Commissioner Kalaburagi
Karnataka Website
Karnataka Information Profile

Divisions of Karnataka